On 24 July 2010, a crowd disaster at the 2010 Love Parade electronic dance music festival in Duisburg, North Rhine-Westphalia, Germany, caused the deaths of 21 people from suffocation as attendees sought to escape a ramp leading to the festival area. 652 people were injured.

The Love Parade was a free-access music festival and parade that originated in 1989 in Berlin. The parade featured stages, but also had floats with music, DJs, and dancers moving through the audience. The Love Parade in Duisburg was the first time that the festival had been held in a closed-off area. Between 200,000 and  people were reported to be attending the event and 3,200 police were on hand.

As a consequence of the disaster, the organizer of the festival announced that no further Love Parades would be held and that the festival was permanently cancelled. Criminal charges were brought against ten employees of the city of Duisburg and of the company that organized the event, but eventually rejected by the court due to the prosecutors' failure to establish evidence for the alleged acts of negligence and their causal connection to the deaths. On 18 April 2017 the Oberlandesgericht Düsseldorf stated that it would be reopening court proceedings for prosecution of 10 people involved in planning the event, accusing them of negligent homicide and mayhem. The first hearing of the trial was held on 8 December 2017. The trial was discontinued in May 2020, because it was adjudged that no individual did such a great wrong that ten years of trial were not already enough punishment.

Background 
With the slogan "The Art of Love", the event was a prominent part of RUHR.2010, a campaign to celebrate Germany's Ruhr valley as one of 2010's European Capitals of Culture. The festival which had previously been a parade through Berlin was staged on the grounds of a former freight station in 2010. The confined area had a maximum capacity of 250,000 people; the average turnout of the previous years would have suggested a number of close to one million attendees for the event.

Bruce Cullen of Parker, Colorado, and founder of Trance Elements, a LoveParade artist/performer on float number 7 – "The Ship of Fools", mentioned that he and other performers were concerned before the event that there would be problems, stating "we all said it seems like this is not going to work". Although Cullen did not witness the actual event, he stated: "These guys didn't have this planned out right", "They didn't have enough police at the entrances in that tunnel. I am just really upset because people died. Everybody was there to have fun".

Incident
Admittance to the festival grounds was supposed to begin 11:00 but was deferred until as late as 12:00 CEST. At the convergence of a 240-meter (260 yard) long tunnel extending from the east and a series of underpasses from the west, was a ramp that served as the only entrance and exit point of the festival area; that is, excepting one smaller ramp between the westerly underpasses. In an effort to relieve overcrowding, police at the entrance began instructing new arrivals by loudspeaker to turn back. Despite being told that the tunnel's only exit was barred off, one which would have otherwise led to the parade area encircling the festival, people continued pushing on into the confined space of the tunnel from the rear. The fatalities occurred when the ramp between tunnel underpasses and the festival area overcrowded until there was a crush. One police officer reported that;

There was some debate as to how the deaths occurred. Some reports suggested they were caused by people falling off a staircase as they tried to escape the tunnel. However, autopsies showed that all of the fatalities were due to crushed rib cages.

A 2012 scientific analysis of the causes of the disaster dismissed the earlier descriptions of the incident as stampede or crowd panic, and instead found evidence of a phenomenon called "crowd turbulence". The study stated that most people died between the staircase and the billboard on the ramp.

Lopavent GmbH, the organiser of the Love Parade, released a film, depicting an explanation of the events. The film is based on CCTV recordings, explanatory animations, documents, press reports and eyewitness accounts released by the organiser.

Fatalities

A total of 21 people died, 13 women and 8 men, aged between 18 and 38 years. Fourteen of the fatalities were German, including seven men and seven women. Among the seven casualties of other nationalities were two Spanish women aged 21 and 22 years, a 38-year-old Chinese woman living in Germany, a 22-year-old man from the Netherlands, a 21-year-old woman from Italy, a 21-year-old woman from Bosnia-Herzegovina, and a 27-year-old woman from Australia. Fifteen died at the site, six died in hospital.

Aftermath
Police chose not to close down the event, fearing that doing so could spark another panic. Nearby motorway A59, which was closed during the whole Love Parade, functioned as an access route for emergency services.

During a press conference on 25 July, organiser Rainer Schaller stated that there would never again be another Love Parade, out of respect for those who lost their lives, and the festival was permanently cancelled. "The Love Parade has always been a joyful and peaceful party, but in the future would always be overshadowed by yesterday's events", he stated.A local resident published internal documents of the city administration regarding the planning of Love Parade. The city government reacted by securing a court order on 16 August forcing the removal of the documents from the site on which it was hosted. On 20 August 2010, WikiLeaks released a publication entitled Loveparade 2010 Duisburg planning documents, 2007–2010, which comprised 43 internal documents regarding the Love Parade 2010, from the Duisburg police, contractors at the parade and other parties involved from 2007 to 2010.

Investigation 
The German police and State's Attorney (Staatsanwaltschaft) opened a criminal investigation. In 2016, a Duisburg court rejected the case, stating that the prosecutors had failed to "establish proof for the acts of negligence the defendants have been charged with, and for their causality". Central to the court's concerns were numerous flaws in the report by professor Keith Still, a British crowd safety expert from Manchester Metropolitan University, which formed the basis of the charges.

The report's initial version from 2011 was described by Süddeutsche Zeitung as "sloppily written and full of errors"; the judges subjected it to more than 70 follow-up questions over the next few years and eventually called it "unusable due to professor Still's serious violations of the basic duties of an expert witness." Keith Still was also criticized by newspapers and the victims' attorney for disregarding possible mistakes by the police, causing the prosecutors to only include staff of the event organizer and the city among the ten defendants it charged.

Legal 
In April 2017, a Higher Regional Court (Oberlandesgericht) decided that a criminal trial against 10 festival organizers and city employees should go ahead. It ruled that there was a "sufficient probability" of convictions and that the lower court (Landgericht) had set "overly high demands" of the chances of conviction to make its decision. The Higher Court dismissed several key aspects of the lower court's judgment, including ruling that evidence from Keith Still was admissible.

The trial started on 8 December 2017 in Düsseldorf.
After many years of investigations and 183 main trial days, the criminal proceedings were discontinued in May 2020. The court found the area was not suitable for the Love Parade 2010 anyway; none of the ten defendants were sentenced.

Culpability 
None of the involved organizations or officials took the blame for the disaster by 29 July. Instead, the involved parties issued several statements accusing each other in a circular manner:

On 26 July, Rainer Schaller, organiser of the festival, accused the police of mistakes in crowd control, which he claims led to the disaster. On 28 July, the interior minister of North Rhine-Westphalia rejected this and assigned all the blame to Schaller, his company Lopavent, their security concept and the festival personnel.

On 14 August, it became known that Duisburg mayor  admitted to deceiving the public about the expected number of visitors at the event. The "several million people" he had been referring to prior to the parade were only "pushed numbers" for media attention in accordance with the organiser of the event. The organiser and the administration had also claimed 1.4 million visitors on the day the disaster occurred but it turned out that the festival area proper (excluding the ramp, tunnel, underpasses, and crowded streets outside the access points), which had been approved for 250,000, was apparently not filled at the time. Due to threats on his life, Sauerland was under police protection at that time.

Reactions
German Chancellor Angela Merkel quickly issued a statement that she was "aghast and saddened by the sorrow and the pain". German President Christian Wulff also expressed his condolences for the victims of the tragedy that had "caused death, sorrow and pain amidst a peaceful festival of cheerful young people from many countries. ... My thoughts are with the victims of the tragedy and with all their family and friends".

On 29 July, several hundred people rallied at Duisburg's city hall, demanding the resignation of the mayor, Adolf Sauerland, depicting him at the gallows. The protesters claimed that Sauerland had been aware of sub-standard security provisions for the festival, but pushed his administration to approve the plans nonetheless. Sauerland, however, rejected the claims and repeatedly said he would not resign. According to local trade union ver.di, members of all parts of the urban administration of Duisburg were threatened (sanitation workers, call center agents). Traffic wardens were not sent out at all for security reasons.

After the Duisburg city council failed to reach a two-thirds majority to trigger an impeachment against lord mayor Sauerland (his CDU refused to vote against him) on 13 September, the state government announced changes to the municipal code of North-Rhine-Westphalia. Interior secretary Ralf Jäger was responsible for both this reform and the police in North-Rhine-Westphalia, at the same time he is leader of the Duisburg Social Democrats.

Sauerland was removed from office through a recall election on 12 February 2012.

Depiction in media
The incident is directly referred to with footage in the 2011 documentary Life in a Day. In 2010, a song titled "Remember Love" was produced by Paul van Dyk, Paul Oakenfold and Armin van Buuren with the proceeds going to the families of the victims of the disaster.

In 2014, German rock band Axxis released a song titled "21 Crosses", which demands the truth about who was to blame, with the names of the killed victims being recited at the end of the song.

The German television drama film  (German: "Das Leben danach"), filmed and edited by director Nicole Weegmann, is from the perspective of a traumatised survivor, portrayed by actress Jella Haase. The 90-minute feature film was first broadcast on ARD on 27 September 2017.

See also

 List of fatal crowd crushes
 Herd behaviour
 Crowd control

References

External links
 Sean Nye and Ronald Hitzler. The Love Parade: European Techno, The EDM Festival, and The Tragedy in Duisburg
 6 monitoring videos 16:20 - 16:40 o'clock
 Love Parade Duisburg, 24 July 2010, multi perspective video, 16:30 - 17:15 o'clock

2010 in German music
2010 disasters in Germany
2010s in North Rhine-Westphalia
Concert disasters
Culture in Duisburg
Disasters in North Rhine-Westphalia
Human stampedes in 2010
Human stampedes in Germany
July 2010 events in Germany
Disaster
Tunnel disasters